Out of bounds refers generally to an area which one is not permitted to enter; it is the British equivalent of the American "off limits". 

Out of bounds may also refer to:

Film and television
 Out of Bounds (1986 film), a 1986 film starring Anthony Michael Hall
 Out of Bounds (2003 film), a 2003 film
 Out of Bounds (2005 film), a 2005 documentary film on the Iwahig Prison and Penal Farm in the Philippines
 Out of Bounds (TV series), a 1977 children's action drama serial about two teenage gymnasts
 Out of Bounds (2019 film), a 2019 American crime drama about a high school student turned drug dealer

Literature
Out of Bounds (play), a 1962 play by Arthur Watkyn
 Out of Bounds (autobiography), a 1989 American book about football player Jim Brown
 Out of Bounds (comic strip), a comic strip created by Don Wilder and Bill Rechin
 Out of Bounds (McDermid novel), a 2016 crime novel set in Scotland by Val McDermid
 Out of Bounds, a 2004 young adult novel by Annie Bryant in the Beacon Street Girls series
 Out of Bounds: Stories of Conflict and Hope, a 2003 book by Beverley Naidoo
 Out of Bounds (1934–1935), a magazine about English public school politics by Esmond Romilly
 Out of Bounds: The Education of Giles Romilly and Esmond Romilly (1916–1967), 1935 book by Esmond and his brother Giles

Music
 Out of Bounds (Eric Bana album), a 1994 comedy album by Australian actor Eric Bana
 Out of Bounds (No Fun at All album), by the Swedish band No Fun at All
 Out of Bounds (Rajaton album), a 2006 music album of the Finnish ensemble Rajaton

Other uses
 Out of bounds, in programming languages; see Bounds checking

See also
 Out-of-band,